Cujmir is a commune in Mehedinți County, Oltenia, Romania, with 3,834 inhabitants as of 2002. It is composed of three villages: Aurora, Cujmir and Cujmiru Mic.

References

Communes in Mehedinți County
Localities in Oltenia